Caught Up in the Country is the fifth studio album by American country music artist Rodney Atkins. It was released on May 10, 2019 by Curb Records.

Caught Up in the Country was Atkins' first studio album since Take a Back Road nearly eight years earlier. The album features two duets with his wife Rose Falcon, as well as an appearance by the Fisk Jubilee Singers.

The album was produced by Ted Hewitt, Blake Bollinger, and Atkins.

Commercial performance
The album debuted at No. 28 on the Top Country Albums for the chart week of May 25, 2019 on its release. It has sold 5,500 copies in the United States as of July 2019.

The album's lead single, the title track, peaked at number 20 on the Hot Country Songs and number 21 on the Country Airplay. A second single, "Thank God for You", was released on August 21, 2019.

Track listing
"Burn Something" (Blake Bollinger, Jessie Jo Dillon, Josh Thompson) – 3:23
"Caught Up in the Country" (Connie Harrington, Jordan Schmidt, Mike Walker) – 2:41
featuring the Fisk Jubilee Singers
"Figure You Out (Riddle)" (Andrew Dorff, Casey Beathard, Monty Criswell) – 3:59
featuring Rose Falcon
"Thank God for You" (Blake Chaffin, Jon McElroy, Logan Mize, Randy Montana) – 3:35
"So Good" (Atkins, Wil Nance) – 2:57
"What Lonely Looks Like" (Barry Dean, Luke Laird) – 3:27
"My Life" (Curt Gibbs, Atkins, Rose Falcon) – 3:11
"Cover Me Up" (Jason Isbell) – 4:16
"All My Friends Are Drunk" (Jimmy Yeary, Lee Thomas Miller, Criswell) – 3:42
"Young Man" (Atkins, Falcon, Matt Rogers) – 3:13
"Everybody's Got Something" (Harrington, Ben Glover, Jessi Alexander) – 3:20
featuring Rose Falcon
"Waiting on a Good Day" (Atkins, Hewitt) – 3:03

Personnel
Adapted from liner notes.

Rodney Atkins - acoustic guitar, programming, lead vocals
Blake Bollinger - keyboards, programming, background vocals
Dave Cohen - keyboards
David Dorn - keyboards
Mark Evitts - fiddle, strings
Rose Falcon - background vocals, duet vocals on "Figure You Out (Riddle)" and "Everybody's Got Something"
Larry Franklin - fiddle
Jason Gantt - electric guitar
Vicki Hampton - background vocals
Ted Hewitt - acoustic guitar, programming, background vocals
Jim Hoke - harmonica
Brandon Hood - acoustic guitar, electric guitar
Evan Hutchings - drums
Mike Johnson - steel guitar
Kim Keyes - background vocals
Troy Lancaster - electric guitar
Chiara Liuzzi - sounds
Tony Lucido - bass guitar
Jerry McPherson - electric guitar
Miles McPherson - drums
Jimmy Nichols - keyboards
Larry Paxton - bass guitar
Gary Prim - keyboards
Danny Rader - acoustic guitar
Jeff Roach - keyboards
Jimmie Lee Sloas - bass guitar
Bobby Terry - acoustic guitar
Ilya Toshinsky - acoustic guitar
Adolfo La Volpe - electronics
Clint Wells - acoustic guitar
Lonnie Wilson - drums
Jonathan Yudkin - fiddle

The Fisk Jubilee Singers on "Caught Up in the Country": Xavier Allison, Melody Beck, Crystal Brooks, Topin Brown, Allen Christian, Kearston Hatch, Anthony Kennedy, Jada Marshall, Dwayne Mitchell, Kiera Pryor, Lance Richards, Victoria Sanders, Javon Sease, Deonte Williams, Justen Williams-Reed

References

2019 albums
Rodney Atkins albums
Curb Records albums